Panruti is a developing city, municipality and taluk headquarters of Cuddalore district, Tamil Nadu, India. Panruti is located between Cuddalore and Neyveli. Panruti is famous for jackfruits and cashew nuts. The jackfruit grown here is exported worldwide and is very sweet. It is a business capital of Cuddalore district. Kananchavadi one of the villages in panruti taluk, famous for palm juice. It has been a great commercial area for more than 200 years. A 150-year-old government school was built here by the British East India Company and a more-than-1000-year-old temple Veerattaneswarar temple is nearby in Thiruvathigai. As of 2011, the town had a population of 60,323.

Overview
Panruti Panchayat was established as Town Panchayat in 1886 . Panruti Town Panchayat was established as Panruti Municipal with the inclusion of Thiruvathigai Town Panchayat then 3rd Grade Panruti Municipality was established by the inclusion of the surrounding hamlet villages as per G.O Order No 2117 Dated 1.10.1966 by Tamil Nadu Govt.

Due to the high revenue of agricultural income from crops such as jackfruit, cashews, and beetlenut this municipality was upgraded as 2nd Grade Municipality as per G.O Order No 533 Dated 22 March 1975 by the Tamil Nadu Govt. As per Water Supply Department this municipality was upgraded as 1st Grade Municipality as per G.O. Order No 715 Dated 6.10.89 Total Area of this Municipality is 18.03 km2. From 1969 on wards the Municipal Election are being conducted as per Tamil Nadu Government Rules. As per Municipal Administration and Water Supply Department Order No 133 Dated 6 June 1996 the strength of municipal councilors was increased from 24 to 33 due to the population increases as per the census in 1971.
The government of Tamil Nadu has built railway bridge which was open in March 2018 in panruti

Etymology
The creators of various  ( in Tamil) were also titled .. The name Panruti evolved "Pan Urutti" ('pan' means  means rolling things) word for people who created music by rolling stones in the river when water flows up (Thenpennai river).

Geography
Panruti is located at 11.77°N 79.55°E. Panruti is located on the main line of high ways. National highway NH-36 passes through this town, connects Vikravandi and Manamadurai. State Highway SH-68 connects Cuddalore - Sankarapuram passes through Panruti. The town lies in mainway of Chennai and Kumbakonam. The town is well-connected with major cities in Tamilnadu.It has an average elevation of 32 metres (104 feet). The Kedilam River flows through the town and Thenpennai river is nearby.

Economy
Panruti produces cashews, jackfruits, sugar canes and many vegetables. Panruti plays a major role in the cashew export business, exporting to Malaysia, Australia, Singapore, and the United States. It is known for its famous international jackfruit market, from where jackfruit is exported to many other countries. It is also a commercial center of Cuddalore district. The Rathinampillai market located in the center of the city attracts thousands of people everyday from morning 5:00 a.m. itself. Nearby villages are Sathipattu, Maligampattu, pillaiyarkuppam, thalampattu, keeliruppu, meliruppu, semmedu, panikkankuppam, thiruvadhigai, Anguchetty palayam, Chinnapettai, Thiruthuraiyur, Varinjipakkam, Puthupettai or Pudupet, Bandrakottai, Mandhipalayam, Oraiyur, Melmampattu, Kadampuliyar, Kananchavadi, Keezhmampattu, Azhagappasamuthiram and Periyakattupalayam. Many nearby villages are famous for weaving  Lungi, and Silk sarees.

Demographics

According to 2011 census, Panruti had a population of 60,323 with a sex-ratio of 996 females for every 1,000 males, much above the national average of 929. A total of 6,257 were under the age of six, constituting 3,204 males and 3,053 females. Scheduled Castes and Scheduled Tribes accounted for 15.02% and .19% of the population respectively. The average literacy of the town was 76.19%, compared to the national average of 72.99%. The town had a total of 14170 households. There were a total of 21,822 workers, comprising 948 cultivators, 2,174 main agricultural labourers, 370 in house hold industries, 14,624 other workers, 3,706 marginal workers, 122 marginal cultivators, 1,660 marginal agricultural labourers, 93 marginal workers in household industries and 1,831 other marginal workers.

As per the religious census of 2011, Panruti had 87.36% Hindus, 11% Muslims, 1.3% Christians, 0.01% Sikhs, 0.03% Buddhists, 0.25% Jains and 0.04% following other religions.

Politics 
The current MLA is T. Velmurugan
The current Member of Parliament from the constituency is Mr. T.R.V.S. Ramesh from the party DMK.

Temples of Panruti
Veeratteswarar temple in nearby Thiruvathigai. According to the legend Thirugnana Sambanthar was glorified by the cosmic dance of Lord Shiva at this holy place. Appar's sister Thilakavathiyar settled here during her later years and devoted her lifetime service to the Lord Siva. Also notable saints Thirunavukkarasar, and Arunagirinathar visited and wrote many hymns on the Lord. Afflicted by a painful illness, Thirunavukkarasar prayed for relief at this temple where his sister Thilagavathiyar served and was cured. This temple is the place where Lord Shiva destroyed three rakshashas (demons) and the three cities created by them.  This temple is one among the 8 Veera Siva temples in Tamil Nadu.

Thiruvathigai Saranarayana Perumal, another name of Lord Vishnu, is the one who gave the saram (arrow) to Lord Shiva for killing the demons. Hence the name Saranarayanar. 1300 Old Renganathar Temple is also located in Thiruvathigai dedicated to Lord Vishnu.

Panchaloha Gandhi Statue in Panruti
A five-foot-tall Gandhi statue at Gandhi park near the Four-Road junction at Panruti was found in the month of September 2016, Dust had accumulated on the layers of paintwork, haphazardly done in bursts of administrative energy. When the civic body officials  swung into action to give the park a much-needed facelift, little did they know that amid the thick outgrowth of weeds was hidden a treasure trove.
The statue that braved the elements for over six decades was found to be made of Panchaloha - an amalgamation of five precious metals and alloys - worth several crores of rupees, with gold comprising around 20 per cent of the statue's 200-odd kg weight i.e. 40 kg of gold in it.

See also
Andikuppam
Balavihar School
PerperiyanKuppam
Sathipattu
Vegakollai

References

Cities and towns in Cuddalore district